KGRI may refer to:

 KGRI (FM), a radio station (88.1 FM) licensed to Lebanon, Oregon, United States
 KGRI (AM), a defunct daytime only radio station (1000 AM) licensed to Henderson, Texas, USA 
 the ICAO code for Central Nebraska Regional Airport